Lebanese Air Transport s.a.l. is a Ground Handling Company based in Beirut, Lebanon and is owned by Abela Group.

References

Aircraft ground handling companies